Genius: The Best of Warren Zevon is a compilation album by American musician Warren Zevon, released in 2002.

Reception
Writing for AllMusic, Stephen Thomas Erlewine wrote, "Although there was the double-disc set I'll Sleep When I'm Dead and a 1986 hits collection, there was no set produced during the CD era that chronicled not just [Zevon's] heyday, but his late-1980s comeback while cherrypicking highlights from the 1990s. This does exactly that over the course of a generous, sharply selected 22 tracks. Given the space, it's inevitable that some great songs are missing."

Track listing

Personnel

Warren Zevon –  synthesizer, harmonica, piano, keyboards, electric piano, vocals, synthesizer strings
Bill Berry –  drums
Charlie Bisharat –  violin
Roy Bittan –  piano
Jackson Browne –  harmony vocals
Peter Buck –  guitar
Lindsey Buckingham –  harmony vocals
Linda Ronstadt –  harmony vocals
Rosemary Butler –  harmony vocals
Jorge Calderón –  bass guitar, guitar, harmony vocals
Mike Campbell –  guitar
Larry Corbett –  cello
Joel Derouin –  violin
Kenny Edwards –  harmony vocals
Don Felder –  guitar
Anton Fig –  drums
Mick Fleetwood –  drums
Glenn Frey –  rhythm guitar, harmony vocals
Bob Glaub –  bass
Richard Hayward –  drums
Don Henley –  harmony vocals
Jim Horn –  saxophone
Jim Keltner –  drums
Bobby Keyes –  saxophone
Larry Klein –  bass
Craig Krampf –  drums
Russ Kunkel –  drums
Kipp Lennon –  harmony vocals
Mark Lennon –  harmony vocals
Michael Lennon –  harmony vocals
David Lindley –  fiddle, guitar, slide guitar, lap steel guitar
Rick Marotta –  drums, harmony vocals
John McVie –  bass
Mike Mills –  bass
Graham Nash –  harmony vocals
Jeff Porcaro –  drums
The Sid Sharp Strings –  choir
Leland Sklar –  bass
J.D. Souther –  harmony vocals
Benmont Tench –  organ
Waddy Wachtel –  guitar, harmony vocals, 12 string acoustic guitar
Jennifer Warnes –  harmony vocals
Winston Watson –  drums
Evan Wilson –  viola
Jai Winding –  piano
Neil Young –  harmony vocals
Larry Zack –  drums
Jordan Zevon –  harmony vocals

Technical

Warren Zevon – compilation producer, producer, mixing, string arrangements, art direction, phtogoraphy
Gary Peterson – compilation producer
Duncan Aldrich – producer, engineer, mixing
Niko Bolas – producer, engineer
 Jackson Browne – producer
Paul Q. Kolderie – producer, engineer
Greg Ladanyi – producer, engineer, mixing
Sean Slade – producer, engineer
Andrew Slater – producer
Waddy Wachtel – producer
Richard Bosworth – engineer
Matt Chiaravasll – engineer
John Cutler – engineer
Michael Delugg – engineer
Marc DeSisto – engineer
John Haeny – engineer
 Andy Jackson – engineer
Rob Jacobs – engineer, mixing
Dennis Kirk – engineer, mixing
Richard Landers – engineer
Michael McDonald – engineer
Tim Mulligan – engineer
Kent Nebergall – engineer
Jim Nipar – engineer
Fritz Richmond – engineer
Rail Jon Rogut – engineer
Will Schillinger – engineer
 Noah Scot Snyder – engineer, mixing
Bob Vogt – engineer
Rob Jaczko – mixing
John Beverly Jones – mixing
Shelly Yakus – mixing
Teresa Caffin – remastering
Bill Inglot – remastering
Mike Engstrom – product manager
Randy Perry – project assistant
 Hugh Brown – art direction and design, photography
Bryan Lasley – design
John Austin – licensing
Cory Frye – editorial supervision
Tim Scanlin – liner notes coordination
William Lee Self – liner notes

Charts

References

Warren Zevon compilation albums
Albums produced by Greg Ladanyi
2002 greatest hits albums
Rhino Records compilation albums